This is a list of schools in the Riverina region of New South Wales, Australia. The New South Wales education system traditionally consists of primary schools, which accommodate students from Kindergarten to Year 6 (ages 5–12), and high schools, which accommodate students from Year 7 to Year 12 (ages 12–18).

Public schools

Primary schools (K-6)

High schools

In New South Wales, a high school generally covers Years 7 to 12 in the education system, and a central or community school, intended to provide comprehensive education in a rural district, covers Kindergarten to Year 12. An additional class of high schools has emerged in recent years as a result of amalgamations which have produced multi-campus colleges consisting of Junior and Senior campuses.

While most schools are comprehensive and take in all students of high school age living within its defined school boundaries, some schools are either specialist in a given Key Learning Area, or selective in that they set examinations or other performance criteria for entrance.

Special schools 

Special schools are public schools designed for children or youth with chronic disabilities or who for other reasons cannot be accommodated in the comprehensive school system.

Defunct primary schools

Defunct high schools

Private schools
Independent or private schools are those schools run by an independent organisation, typically a school board or council.

Catholic schools
In New South Wales, Catholic primary schools are usually (but not always) linked to a parish. Prior to the 1970s, most schools were founded by religious institutes, but with the decrease in membership of these institutes, together with major reforms inside the church, lay teachers and administrators began to take over the schools, a process  completed by approximately 1995. The Catholic Education, Diocese of Wagga Wagga (CEDWW) is responsible for coordinating administration, curriculum and policy across the Catholic school system. Preference for enrolment is given to Catholic students from the parish or local area, although non-Catholic students are admitted if room is available.

Catholic private schools

Catholic high schools

Other private schools

Special-purpose private schools
The Government of New South Wales recognises a registration category known as "Prescribed Non-Government Schools" which serve the same purposes as Special Schools but are privately operated.

Defunct private schools

See also

 List of schools in Australia
 List of schools in New South Wales

Riverina
 Schools